Mighty Beanz is a collectable children's toy line of plastic beans created by Moose Enterprises in Melbourne, Australia. The primary Mighty Beanz game is to race the beanz down different types of battle stages.

History

Original line 
The Mighty Beanz line was originally launched in Australia at the beginning of 2002 and found their way to United States markets that summer. Five beans were created:
 “Series 1” included 60 beanz (1-60) divided into teams of one, along with a red carrying case. 
 “Series 2” introduced 70 all new Mighty Beanz (60-130)
. Again, these were divided into teams of one with some beans able to glow in the dark.
 “Series 3” produced only 60 new Mighty Beanz (131-190). This line of Beanz introduced color changing abilities, along with a new green carrying case.
 “Series 4” produced another 60 Mighty Beanz (191-250). This time around, the Beanz were arranged into teams of three and also introduced a new mega Bean, which was substantially larger than the others.
 “Series 5” came with a new name for the Mighty Beanz called Bean Bodz. There were 60 Bean Bodz produced (1-60) bringing the total number of collectibles to 310. Bean Bodz were divided into teams of four and had interchangeable rubber bodies.
Furthermore, Moose Enterprises has portrayed several famous celebrities in the shape of their toy, including Elvis Presley, Hulk Hogan and Steve Irwin.

Besides Mighty Beanz, Moose Enterprises also manufactured three Mighty Beanz racetracks to go along with their toys,  Ultimate Jump Park, Collision Chaos, and Super S-Bend. Each track came with two limited edition Beanz that did not have printed numbers on them, making them extremely collectible.

In 2004, a Mighty Beanz video game titled Mighty Beanz Pocket Puzzles was released for the Game Boy Advance.

2018 relaunch 

Moose developed a new line of Mighty Beanz, starting with 140 new Beanz which were released on September 1, 2018. A line of Fortnite-themed Mighty Beanz were produced.
An Easter series and Series 2 of the main line were released in early 2019.

References

External links
 Original Site

2000s toys
Products introduced in 2002
Toy brands